Sune Andersson (21 April 1898 — 8 March 1981) was a Swedish footballer and ice hockey player. As a footballer, he made three appearances for Sweden and three Allsvenskan appearances for Djurgårdens IF. Andersson appeared in the 1919 Svenska Mästerskapet Final for Djurgården, which they lost to GAIS.

As an ice hockey player, Sune Andersson was part of Djurgårdens IF's Swedish national ice hockey champions' team of 1926.

References

External links

Swedish footballers
Djurgårdens IF Fotboll players
Swedish ice hockey players
Djurgårdens IF Hockey players
1898 births
1981 deaths
Association football forwards